Habroteleia is a genus of parasitic wasps in the family Platygastridae. There are about 9 described species in Habroteleia.

Species
These 9 species are recognized as valid species.
 Habroteleia flavipes Kieffer, 1905 
 Habroteleia impressa (Kieffer, 1916) 
 Habroteleia mutabilis Chen & Talamas, 2018
 Habroteleia persimilis (Kozlov & Kononova)
 Habroteleia ruficoxa (Kieffer, 1916)
 Habroteleia salebra Chen & Talamas, 2018
 Habroteleia scapularis (Kieffer, 1916) 
 Habroteleia soa Chen & Talamas, 2018
 Habroteleia spinosa Chen & Talamas, 2018

Former species
Former species are now described as junior synonyms under following two species.

H. flavipes
Habroteleia bharatensis Saraswat, 1978
Habroteleia browni Crawford, 1910

H. persimilis
Habroteleia kotturensis (Sharma, 1981) 
Habroteleia dagavia (Kozlov & Lê, 1995)

References

Further reading

Parasitic wasps
Scelioninae